"And the Sun Will Shine" is a song by the British rock band Bee Gees, it was written by Barry Gibb, Robin Gibb and Maurice Gibb and released in February 1968 on the album Horizontal. The song's opening chord was D7, consisting of the notes D, F, A, and C.

It was released as a single in France backed with "Really and Sincerely" and reached #66 there.

Background and recording
The earliest session for Horizontal was really just a demo date to tape rough versions of the brothers' new songs. Venturing to Denmark Street (known as London's Tin Pan Alley), the Bee Gees booked Central Sound for July 17, quickly cutting several tracks.

Barry Gibb recalls about the recording of this track:

Robin Gibb said:

This song was the second track they recorded for the album after "Ring My Bell" (which was only released on the 2006 deluxe edition of Horizontal). This song was recorded on July 17 and 30, continued on August 1 and 10 and finally finished on October 28, The second version of this song was recorded on July 25 but it was rejected. This song has a solo vocal that Robin famously did in one take, inventing some of the lyrics on the spot.

Personnel
 Robin Gibb – vocal
 Barry Gibb – guitar
 Maurice Gibb – bass, piano
 Vince Melouney – guitar
 Colin Petersen – drums

Live performances
The first live performances of this song were in 1968 most notably on 4 February 1968 on the US TV show The Smothers Brothers, their first American performance. Other notable recorded performances were at Melbourne, Australia in 1974 on their Mr. Natural tour and a short excerpt on the 1998 live album One Night Only.

Chart performance

Paul Jones version

In the same year, former Manfred Mann frontman Paul Jones recorded the song and released his version as a single, backed with his own song "The Dog Presides".

With Paul McCartney on drums, Jeff Beck on guitar, Paul Samwell-Smith of The Yardbirds on bass and Nicky Hopkins on keyboards, it was produced by Peter Asher, formerly of Peter and Gordon. McCartney's contribution was not credited on Columbia release of the song. Recorded at Abbey Road Studios' Studio 2. Asher had asked McCartney to attend the session and he ended up playing drums on the song.

On the liner notes of The Paul Jones Collection (CD), Jones claimed that "Paul McCartney was on drums on that session, It was during the time I used 
to hang out with Peter Asher and Paul wanted to play drums because he could".

Personnel
 Paul Jones – lead vocal/harmonica
 Jeff Beck – guitar
 Paul Samwell-Smith – bass
 Nicky Hopkins – keyboards
 Paul McCartney – drums

Jose Feliciano version
Puerto Rican singer Jose Feliciano released a cover of the song as a single in August 1969 on RCA Records backed with his own composition "Rain". The Feliciano version ranked 25th in UK Hit Parade. This version peaked at #25 in the UK but notably features Feliciano singing "The thought to me is back and how near" as opposed to "'Cause love to me is life and I live you", an example of a Mondegreen.

References

1968 songs
Bee Gees songs
Songs written by Barry Gibb
Songs written by Robin Gibb
Songs written by Maurice Gibb
Demis Roussos songs
Song recordings produced by Robert Stigwood
Song recordings produced by Barry Gibb
Song recordings produced by Robin Gibb
Song recordings produced by Maurice Gibb
Songs about loneliness
Rock ballads